Kiril Kolev (Macedonian: Кирил Колев; born 18 July 1978) is a former Macedonian handball player.

References

1978 births
Living people
People from Sveti Nikole
Macedonian male handball players
Expatriate handball players
Macedonian expatriate sportspeople in Poland
RK Vardar players